732 Naval Air Squadron (732 NAS) was a Naval Air Squadron of the Royal Navy's Fleet Air Arm. It was initially formed from a requirement for an Operational Training Unit, for Fleet Air Arm pilots flying the Vought Corsair, between 1943 and 1944, at Brunswick, Maine, United States. In 1945, it was reformed, for a brief period, as a Night Fighter Training Squadron, operating out of RNAS Drem, East Lothian, Scotland. Notably equipped with six Avro Anson flying classrooms, amongst other aircraft.

History of 732 NAS

Operational Training Unit (1943 - 1944) 

There was a requirement to form a Fleet Air Arm, second-line, Operational Training Unit (OTU), at Brunswick, specifically for the Vought F4U Corsair, an American Carrier-based fighter-bomber aircraft.

Having completed its purpose, 732 Naval Air Squadron disbanded at Brunswick on the 1 July 1944.

Night Fighter Training Squadron (1945) 
732 Naval Air Squadron reformed at RNAS Drem (HMS Nighthawk), just north of the village of Drem in East Lothian, Scotland, as a Night Fighter Training Squadron, on the 15 May 1945.

RNAS Drem was home to the Fleet Air Arm's, Naval Night Fighter School and Night Fighter Direction Centre. Here, the squadron operated six Avro Anson aircraft, which were fitted out as classrooms, along with six North American Harvard, nine Grumman Hellcat and a number of Fairey Firefly NF.Mk I aircraft.

Roughly six months later, on the 7 November 1945, the squadron disbanded whilst at RNAS Drem, becoming ‘B’ flight of 784 NAS, another Night Fighter Training Squadron.

Aircraft flown 

732 Naval Air Squadron operated two marks of Corsair during 1944 as an OTU at Brunswick. In 1945, at Drem, the squadron operated multiple types of other FAA aircraft:

 Vought F4U Corsair Mk.I (Nov 1943-Jul 1944)
 Vought F4U Corsair Mk.II (Nov 1943-Jul 1944)
 Avro Anson (1945)
 North American Harvard (1945)
 Grumman Hellcat (1945)
 Fairey Firefly NF.Mk I (1945)

Naval Air Stations  

732 Naval Air Squadron operated from a couple of naval air stations of the Royal Navy, in the United States and Scotland:
Royal Naval Air Section BRUNSWICK (23 November 1943 - 1 July 1944)
Royal Naval Air Station DREM (15 May 1945 - 7 November 1945)

Commanding Officers 

List of commanding officers of 732 Naval Air Squadron with month and year of appointment and end:

1943 - 1944
Lt-Cdr (A) M.S. Goodson, RNVR (Nov 1943-Jan 1944)
Lt-Cdr W.N. Waller, RN (Jan 1944-Jul 1944)

1945
Lt (A) M.B.W. Howell, RNVR (May 1945-Aug 1945)
Lt-Cdr (A) A.M. Tritton, DSC, RNVR (Aug 1945-Nov 1945)

References

Citations

Bibliography

700 series Fleet Air Arm squadrons
Military units and formations established in 1943
Air squadrons of the Royal Navy in World War II